Elachista anserinella is a moth of the family Elachistidae. It is found from Scandinavia and the Baltic region to the Pyrenees, Italy and Greece and from France to Russia.

Adults are on wing from May to June.

The larvae feed on Brachypodium pinnatum. They mine the leaves of their host plant. Larvae can be found in late spring.

References

anserinella
Moths described in 1839
Moths of Europe